Katherine Clare Timpf (born October 29, 1988) is a libertarian columnist, television personality, reporter, and comedian. She is currently a regular panelist/co-host of Fox News Channel's Gutfeld! and appears as a contributor on various other Fox News shows. In 2017, Timpf co-hosted Fox News Specialists alongside Eric Bolling and Eboni K. Williams. As of June 2019, she hosts the Fox Nation show Sincerely, Kat.

Early life and education
Timpf is from Detroit, Michigan. She graduated magna cum laude in 2010 from Hillsdale College with a B.A. in English.

Career
Timpf has appeared on numerous television and radio programs, including America Live with Megyn Kelly, Your World with Neil Cavuto, Fox and Friends, Red Eye, Stossel, Gutfeld!, The Five, Outnumbered,  The Nightly Show with Larry Wilmore.

She has worked for the Leadership Institute's CampusReform.org in Arlington, Virginia. She has worked as a digital editor for The Washington Times, as the news anchor for NASA's Third Rock Radio, and as a producer and reporter for Total Traffic Network in Santa Ana, California.

Timpf was a 2012 Robert Novak Journalism Fellowship Program grant award recipient through The Fund for American Studies, and completed a project titled, "As California Goes, So Goes the Nation: The Consequences of Following Golden State Policy."

Timpf has been a contributor to Orange County Register, Investor's Business Daily, Pittsburgh Post-Gazette, International Business Times, and The Washington Times, and a comedienne on the morning drive radio show on Baltimore's 98 Rock.

In November 2015, Timpf said that she received death threats after making satirical remarks about the Star Wars fandom.

In 2016 and 2017 she contributed to the "Barstool Sports" Web site. She hosted a weekly podcast called The Kat Timpf Show, in which she talks to a guest about random subjects, including her personal life.

On May 1, 2017, Timpf became a co-host for Fox News Channel's afternoon show called Fox News Specialists with co-hosts Eric Bolling and Eboni K. Williams. Fox News Specialists was canceled on September 8, 2017, after Eric Bolling was fired by the network for alleged sexual misconduct.

Timpf's December 27, 2018 column was publicly retracted by National Review. National Review has stated that the column "left out relevant details" of a Title IX sexual harassment case involving students at the University of Missouri. Timpf's story implied that a female student had complained about unwanted advances due to the fact that the alleged harasser was larger than she was; according to National Review, however, a deposition in the case revealed that the alleged harasser "had made repeated, unwelcome advances toward the female student and was found in violation of Title IX for stalking her".

She co-hosts the weekly Fox News Radio podcast Tyrus and Timpf with professional wrestler Tyrus. 

She was a keynote speaker at the Young Americans for Liberty's 2019 YALCON in Silicon Valley.

On February 8, 2023, Timpf announced on Gutfeld! that she penned a new book titled You Can't Joke About That. The book is scheduled to come out on April 18, 2023.

Personal life
Timpf lives in Manhattan. Timpf is a libertarian and believes in limited government, no involvement in economic policy, and allowing social decisions to be made by the individual. According to Timpf, "there is something about me for everyone to hate, but there is also something about me for everyone to agree on."

Timpf announced her engagement in August 2020, and was married on May 1, 2021 to Cameron Friscia, a graduate of West Point and a research associate at Coatue Management.

References

External links
 

1988 births
Living people
20th-century American women
21st-century American comedians
21st-century American journalists
21st-century American non-fiction writers
21st-century American women writers
American libertarians
American women podcasters
American podcasters
American political commentators
American political journalists
American political writers
American women comedians
American women journalists
American women non-fiction writers
Barstool Sports people
Female critics of feminism
Fox News people
Hillsdale College alumni
Journalists from Michigan
National Review people
Non-interventionism
American opinion journalists
Writers from Detroit
20th-century American people